Țepeș is a Romanian surname. Notable people with the surname include:

 Andrei Țepeș (born 1991), Romanian footballer
 Vlad III the Impaler ( Vlad Țepeș; 1431–1476), Romanian nobleman
 Vlad Țepeș (disambiguation), multiple people

Romanian-language surnames